Harry Potter and the Chamber of Secrets is a 2002 fantasy film directed by Chris Columbus from a screenplay by Steve Kloves, based on the 1998 novel of the same name by J. K. Rowling. Produced by David Heyman, it is the sequel to Harry Potter and the Philosopher's Stone (2001) and the second instalment in the Harry Potter film series. The film stars Daniel Radcliffe as Harry Potter, with Rupert Grint and Emma Watson as his best friends Ron Weasley and Hermione Granger respectively. The story follows Harry's second year at Hogwarts School of Witchcraft and Wizardry, where the Heir of Salazar Slytherin opens the Chamber of Secrets, unleashing a monster that petrifies the school's students.

The film was released in the United Kingdom and the United States on 15 November 2002, by Warner Bros. Pictures. Critics praised its darker plot, sets and a story appropriate for a young audience, and it became a critical and commercial success, grossing $879 million worldwide and becoming the second-highest-grossing film of 2002. The film was nominated for many awards, including the BAFTA Award for Best Production Design, Best Sound, and Best Special Visual Effects. It was followed by Harry Potter and the Prisoner of Azkaban (2004).

Plot

Spending the summer with the Dursleys, Harry Potter meets Dobby, a house-elf who warns him that it is dangerous to return to Hogwarts. Dobby sabotages an important dinner for the Dursleys, who lock up Harry to prevent his return to Hogwarts. Harry's friend Ron Weasley and his brothers Fred and George rescue him in their father's flying car.

In Diagon Alley, Harry, the Weasleys and Hermione Granger notice a book-signing by Gilderoy Lockhart, Hogwarts' new Defence Against the Dark Arts teacher. There, Harry sees Draco Malfoy's father, Lucius, slip a book into Ginny Weasley's cauldron. After being blocked from entering Platform Nine and Three-Quarters at King's Cross railway station, Harry and Ron take the car to Hogwarts. There, they crash into the Whomping Willow, breaking Ron's wand, and receive detention.

In detention, Harry hears a strange voice and later finds caretaker Argus Filch's cat, Mrs Norris, petrified beside a message written in blood: "The Chamber of Secrets has been opened, enemies of the heir... beware." One of Hogwarts' founders, Salazar Slytherin, supposedly constructed a secret Chamber containing a monster that only his heir can control, capable of purging the school of Muggle-born students. To solve this mystery, Harry, Ron, and Hermione plan to question Malfoy, using polyjuice potion, which they brew in a bathroom haunted by Moaning Myrtle, a ghost.

During a Quidditch game, Harry's arm is broken by a rogue Bludger. Dobby visits him in the infirmary and reveals that he closed the barrier to  Platform Nine and Three-Quarters and made the Bludger chase Harry to force him to leave the school. He also reveals that the Chamber had been opened in the past. When Harry communicates with a snake, the school believes he is the heir. Disguised as two of Malfoy's friends, Harry and Ron learn he is not the heir, but come to know that a Muggle-born girl died when the Chamber was last opened. Harry finds an enchanted diary owned by former student Tom Riddle, who opened the Chamber and blamed Rubeus Hagrid, leading to his expulsion. When the diary is stolen and Hermione is petrified, Harry and Ron question Hagrid. Professor Dumbledore, Minister of Magic Cornelius Fudge, and Lucius arrive to take Hagrid to Azkaban, but he discreetly tells the boys to "follow the spiders". In the Forbidden Forest, Harry and Ron meet Hagrid's giant pet spider, Aragog, who reveals Hagrid's innocence.

A book page in Hermione's hand identifies the monster as a basilisk, a giant serpent that kills people who make direct eye contact with it; the petrified victims only saw it indirectly. The school staff learns Ginny has been taken into the Chamber, and nominate Lockhart to save her. Harry and Ron find Lockhart preparing to flee, exposing him as a fraud. Deducing that Myrtle was the Muggle-born girl that the basilisk killed, they find the Chamber's entrance in the bathroom she haunts. Once inside, Lockhart tries to stop Harry and Ron by using a memory charm. However, because he seized Ron's broken wand, the spell backfires, erasing Lockhart's memory and causing a cave-in that separates Harry from Ron and Lockhart.

Harry enters the Chamber alone and finds Ginny unconscious, guarded by Riddle. Riddle turns out to be Slytherin's heir and Voldemort's younger self. He used the diary to manipulate Ginny into reopening the Chamber. After Harry expresses his loyalty to Dumbledore, the latter's pet phoenix Fawkes arrives with the Sorting Hat, causing Riddle to summon the basilisk. Fawkes blinds the basilisk, and the Sorting Hat produces the Sword of Gryffindor, with which Harry battles the basilisk. After a struggle, he kills it but is poisoned by one of its fangs.

Despite his injury, Harry stabs the diary with the basilisk fang, destroying Riddle and reviving Ginny. Fawkes' tears heal Harry, who returns to Hogwarts with his friends and a baffled Lockhart, earning Dumbledore's praise and Hagrid's release. Harry accuses Lucius, Dobby's master, of planting the diary in Ginny's cauldron, and tricks him into freeing Dobby. The basilisk's victims are healed, Hermione reunites with Harry and Ron, and Hagrid is released from Azkaban.

Cast

 Daniel Radcliffe as Harry Potter: A 12-year-old British wizard famous for surviving his parents' murder at the hands of the evil wizard Lord Voldemort as an infant, who now enters his second year at Hogwarts School of Witchcraft and Wizardry.
 Rupert Grint as Ron Weasley: Harry's best friend at Hogwarts and one of the youngest members of the Weasley family.
 Emma Watson as Hermione Granger: Harry's other best friend and the trio's brains.
 Kenneth Branagh as Gilderoy Lockhart: A celebrity author and the new Defence Against the Dark Arts teacher at Hogwarts. Hugh Grant was the first choice for the role to play Lockhart, but due to reported scheduling conflicts he was unable to play the character. Alan Cumming was also considered, but withdrew due to salary disputes.
 John Cleese as Nearly Headless Nick: The ghost of Gryffindor House.
 Robbie Coltrane as Rubeus Hagrid: The half-giant gamekeeper at Hogwarts who is framed for opening the Chamber of Secrets and is sent to Azkaban on Lucius Malfoy's orders. Martin Bayfield portrays a young Hagrid.
 Warwick Davis as Filius Flitwick: The Charms teacher at Hogwarts and head of Ravenclaw House.
 Richard Griffiths as Vernon Dursley: Harry's abusive Muggle uncle, who despises wizards and works as a drill company director.
 Richard Harris as Albus Dumbledore: The headmaster of Hogwarts and one of the greatest wizards of the age. This was Harris' final film; he died shortly before it was released. The role of Dumbledore was played by Michael Gambon from Harry Potter and the Prisoner of Azkaban onwards.
 Jason Isaacs as Lucius Malfoy: Draco's father and a former Hogwarts pupil of Slytherin House who now works as a school governor at Hogwarts. Isaacs gave Lucius a whiny tone of voice based on that of the Child Catcher of Chitty Chitty Bang Bang, whose voice had resonated with Isaacs throughout his childhood for the character scaring him.
 Maggie Smith as Minerva McGonagall: The Transfiguration teacher at Hogwarts and head of Gryffindor House.
 Gemma Jones as Madam Pomfrey: The Hogwarts matron.
 Alan Rickman as Severus Snape: The Potions teacher at Hogwarts and head of Slytherin House.
 Fiona Shaw as Petunia Dursley: Harry's Muggle aunt.
 Julie Walters as Molly Weasley: Ron's mother.

Several actors from Philosopher's Stone reprise their roles in this film. Harry Melling portrays Dudley Dursley, Harry's cousin. James and Oliver Phelps play Fred and George Weasley, Ron's twin brothers; Chris Rankin appears as Percy Weasley, Ron's other brother and a Gryffindor prefect; and Bonnie Wright portrays their sister Ginny. Tom Felton plays Draco Malfoy, Harry's rival in Slytherin, while Jamie Waylett and Joshua Herdman appear as Crabbe and Goyle, Draco's minions. Matthew Lewis, Devon Murray and Alfred Enoch play Neville Longbottom, Seamus Finnigan and Dean Thomas, respectively, three Gryffindor students in Harry's year. David Bradley portrays Argus Filch, Hogwarts' caretaker, and Sean Biggerstaff as Oliver Wood, the Keeper of the Gryffindor Quidditch team. Leslie Phillips voices the Sorting Hat.

Christian Coulson appears as Tom Marvolo Riddle, a manifestation of young Lord Voldemort; before Coulson was cast, Eddie Redmayne –who later played Newt Scamander in the Fantastic Beasts films– auditioned for the role. Mark Williams portrays Arthur Weasley, Ron's father. Shirley Henderson plays Moaning Myrtle, a Hogwarts ghost. Miriam Margolyes appears as Pomona Sprout, Hogwarts' Herbology professor and head of Hufflepuff. Hugh Mitchell portrays Colin Creevey, a first year student that is a fan of Harry's. Robert Hardy appears as Cornelius Fudge, the Minister for Magic. Toby Jones voices Dobby, a House-elf, while Julian Glover voices Aragog, an acromantula.

Production

Costume and set design

Production designer Stuart Craig returned for the sequel to design new elements previously not seen in the first film. He designed the Burrow based on Arthur Weasley's interest in Muggles, built vertically out of architectural salvage. Mr. Weasley's flying car was created from a 1962 Ford Anglia 105E. Dumbledore's office, which houses the Sorting Hat and the Sword of Gryffindor, was also built for the film.

Lindy Hemming was the costume designer for Chamber of Secrets. She retained many of the characters' already established appearances, and chose to focus on the new characters introduced in the sequel. Gilderoy Lockhart's wardrobe incorporated bright colours, in contrast with the "dark, muted or sombre colours" of the other characters. Branagh said, "We wanted to create a hybrid between a period dandy and someone who looked as if they could fit into Hogwarts." Hemming also perfected Lucius Malfoy's costume. One of the original concepts was for him to wear a pinstripe suit, but was changed to furs and a snake head cane in order to remark his aristocrat quality and to reflect a "sense of the old."

Filming
Principal photography began on 19 November 2001, only three days after the wide release of the first film. Second-unit work had started three weeks before, primarily for the flying car scene. Filming took place mainly at Leavesden Film Studios in Hertfordshire, as well as on the Isle of Man. King's Cross railway station was used as the filming location for Platform 9¾, though St Pancras railway station was used for the exterior shots. Gloucester Cathedral was used as the setting for Hogwarts School, along with Durham Cathedral, Alnwick Castle, Lacock Abbey, and the Bodleian Library at the University of Oxford. The Burrow was built in Gypsy Lane, Abbots Langley, in front of Leavesden Studios.

Roger Pratt was brought on as director of photography for Chamber of Secrets, in order to give the film "a darker and edgier feel" than its predecessor, which reflected "the growth of the characters and the story." Director Chris Columbus opted to use handheld cameras to allow more freedom in movement, which he considered "a departure for [him] as a filmmaker." University of Cambridge linguistics professor Francis Nolan created Parseltongue, the language spoken by snakes in the film. Principal photography wrapped in July 2002.

Sound design
Due to the events that take place in Harry Potter and the Chamber of Secrets, the film's sound effects were much more expansive than in the previous instalment. Sound designer and co-supervising sound editor Randy Thom returned for the sequel using Pro Tools to complete the job, which included initial conceptions done at Skywalker Sound in California and primary work done at Shepperton Studios in England.

Thom wanted to give the Whomping Willow a voice, a deep growl for which he used his own voice slowed down, equalised and bass-boosted. For the mandrakes, he combined baby cries with female screams, in order to "make it just exotic enough so that you think, 'Hmm, I've never heard anything quite like that before.'"

Thom described the basilisk as a challenge, "because it's a giant snake, but it's also like a dragon — not many snakes have teeth like that. He had to hiss, he had to roar and there were times at the end when he was in pain." He mixed his own voice, tiger roars, and horse and elephant vocalizations.

Special and visual effects

Visual effects took nine months to make, until 9 October 2002, when the film was finished.
Industrial Light & Magic, Mill Film, the Moving Picture Company (MPC), Cinesite and Framestore CFC handled the approximately 950 visual effect shots in the film. Jim Mitchell and Nick Davis served as visual effects supervisors. They were in charge of creating the CG characters Dobby the House Elf, the Basilisk, and the Cornish pixies, among others. Chas Jarrett from MPC served as CG supervisor, overseeing the approach of any shot that contains CG in the film. With a crew of 70 people, the company produced 251 shots, 244 of which made it to the film, from September 2001 to October 2002.

The visual effects team worked alongside creature effects supervisor Nick Dudman, who devised Fawkes the Phoenix, the Mandrakes, Aragog the Acromantula, and the first  of the Basilisk. According to Dudman, Aragog was the most challenging character to create. The whole creature weighed three quarters of a ton. It took over 15 people to operate the animatronic Aragog on set.

The Whomping Willow sequence required a combination of practical and visual effects. Special effects supervisor John Richardson and his team created mechanically operated branches to hit the flying car. The courtyard and the tree were built in 3D. Some shots ended up being entirely digital. Jarret identified the rendering as "the biggest challenge" of the scene, because "there was just so much going on in [it] ... It was simply massive."

Music

John Williams, who composed the previous film's score, returned to score Harry Potter and the Chamber of Secrets. Composing the film proved to be a difficult task, as Williams had just completed scoring Star Wars: Episode II – Attack of the Clones and Minority Report when work was to begin on Catch Me If You Can. Because of this, William Ross was brought in to arrange themes from the Philosopher's Stone into the new material that Williams was composing whenever he had the chance. Ross also conducted the scoring sessions with the London Symphony Orchestra. The soundtrack album was released on 12 November 2002.

Distribution

Marketing
Footage for the film began appearing online in the summer of 2002, with a teaser trailer debuting in cinemas with the release of Scooby-Doo. A video game based on the film was released in early November 2002 by Electronic Arts for several consoles, including GameCube, PlayStation 2, and Xbox. The film also continued the merchandising success set by its predecessor, with reports of shortages on Lego's Chamber of Secrets tie-ins.

Home media
The film was originally released in the UK, US and Canada on 11 April 2003 on both VHS tape and in a two-disc special edition fullscreen/widescreen DVD digipack, which included extended and deleted scenes and interviews. On 11 December 2007, the film's Blu-ray version was released. An Ultimate Edition of the film was released on 8 December 2009, featuring new footage, TV spots, an extended version of the film with deleted scenes edited in, and a feature-length special Creating the World of Harry Potter Part 2: Characters. The film's extended version has a running time of about 174 minutes, which has previously been shown during certain television airings.

Reception

Box office
Harry Potter and the Chamber of Secrets held its world premiere at Odeon Leicester Square on 3 November 2002, and was released in the United Kingdom and the United States on 15 November 2002. The film broke multiple records upon its opening. In the US and Canada, the film opened to an $88.4million opening weekend at 3,682 cinemas, the third-largest opening at the time, behind Spider-Man and its predecessor Harry Potter and the Philosopher's Stone. The film would hold the record for having the largest number of screenings until it was surpassed by X2 the next year. It was also No. 1 at the box office for two non-consecutive weekends. Harry Potter and the Chamber of Secrets was the second 2002 film to return to the number one spot, just after Mel Gibson's Signs. The film joined Die Another Day and The Santa Clause 2 to outperform the weak opening of Treasure Planet. Both Harry Potter and the Chamber of Secrets and Die Another Day were the most recent films to reclaim the number one spot for six months until June 2003 when Finding Nemo became the next film to do so. In the United Kingdom, the film broke all opening records that were previously held by Philosopher's Stone. It made £18.9million during its opening including previews and £10.9million excluding previews.
 It went on to make £54.8million in the UK; at the time, the fifth-biggest tally of all time in the region.

Internationally, the film earned $59.5 million during its opening weekend. The film earned $3.7 million in Japan, making it the highest opening of any film in the country until it was surpassed a year later by The Matrix Reloaded. In Malaysia, Harry Potter and the Chamber of Secrets made a total of $474,000, breaking Erasers record for having the country's biggest opening for any Warner Bros. film. It would go on to generate a total of $1.03 million in Singapore, becoming the second-highest film opening in the country, after The Lost World: Jurassic Park. Meanwhile, the film earned $3.1 million in Taiwan, surpassing The Mummy Returns by 16%. Harry Potter and the Chamber of Secrets would then gross over $1.15 million in the Philippines, ranking as an industry high in the country only 5% bigger than Godzilla. The film made a total of $879.8million worldwide. It was the second-highest-grossing film of 2002 worldwide behind The Lord of the Rings: The Two Towers, and the fourth highest-grossing film in the US and Canada that year with $262.6 million behind Spider-Man, The Two Towers, and Star Wars: Episode II – Attack of the Clones. However, it was the year's number one film outside of America, making $617.2million compared to The Two Towers $584.5million.

Critical response
The site's critical consensus reads, "Though perhaps more enchanting for younger audiences, Chamber of Secrets is nevertheless both darker and livelier than its predecessor, expanding and improving upon the first film's universe." On Metacritic the film has a weighted average score of 63 out of 100, based on 35 critics, indicating "generally favorable reviews". Audiences polled by CinemaScore gave the film a rare "A+", the only film in the Harry Potter series to receive such grade.

Roger Ebert gave The Chamber of Secrets 4 out of 4 stars, especially praising the set design. Entertainment Weekly commended the film for being better and darker than its predecessor: "And among the things this Harry Potter does very well indeed is deepen the darker, more frightening atmosphere for audiences. This is as it should be: Harry's story is supposed to get darker". Richard Roeper praised Columbus' direction and the film's faithfulness to the book, saying: "Chris Columbus, the director, does a real wonderful job of being faithful to the story but also taking it into a cinematic era". Variety said the film was excessively long, but praised it for being darker and more dramatic, saying that its confidence and intermittent flair to give it a life of its own apart from the books was something The Philosopher's Stone never achieved. The Guardian praised the darker storyline, but said that the acting could have been better.

A. O. Scott from The New York Times said: "instead of feeling stirred you may feel battered and worn down, but not, in the end, too terribly disappointed". Peter Travers from Rolling Stone condemned the film for being over-long and too faithful to the book: "Once again, director Chris Columbus takes a hat-in-hand approach to Rowling that stifles creativity and allows the film to drag on for nearly three hours". Kenneth Turan from the Los Angeles Times called the film a cliché which is "deja vu all over again, it's likely that whatever you thought of the first production – pro or con – you'll likely think of this one".

Accolades
Chamber of Secrets was nominated for three BAFTA Awards: Best Production Design, Best Sound, and Best Special Visual Effects. The film was also nominated for six Saturn Awards. It received two nominations at the inaugural Visual Effects Society Awards. The Broadcast Film Critics Association granted it the Best Family Film and Best Composer awards, and nominated it for Best Digital Acting Performance (for Toby Jones).

References

External links

 
 
 
 
 

02
1492 Pictures films
2002 films
2002 fantasy films
2000s fantasy adventure films
2000s American films
American fantasy adventure films
American sequel films
British fantasy adventure films
British sequel films
Films shot in Surrey
Films shot in Highland (council area)
Fictional-language films
Harry Potter 2
Warner Bros. films
Heyday Films films
Films about shapeshifting
Films about spirit possession
Films about spiders
Films set in 1992
Films set in 1993
Films set in England
Films set in Scotland
Films set in London
Films shot in the Isle of Man
Films shot in Gloucestershire
Films shot in Hertfordshire
Films shot in Northumberland
Films shot in Buckinghamshire
Films shot in Oxfordshire
Films shot in County Durham
Films shot in London
Films shot in North Yorkshire
Films shot at Warner Bros. Studios, Leavesden
Films shot in Wiltshire
Films with screenplays by Steve Kloves
Films produced by David Heyman
High fantasy films
IMAX films
Films scored by John Williams
Flying cars in fiction
Films about con artists
Fiction about memory erasure and alteration
Children's fantasy films
Films about phoenixes
Films about elves
2000s English-language films
2000s British films